In diplomacy benevolent neutrality means a neutral country favors one of the belligerents in a war. The term was used by the Germans in 1912 when they were negotiating with the British regarding the Haldane Mission. Germany demanded Britain pledge "benevolent neutrality" toward Germany in case it was in a defensive war. If Britain did so it would jeopardise  its informal alliance with France, so foreign minister Edward Grey refused. Grey later used the term in 1914 to describe US foreign policy on involvement in World War I. 

It is distinct from strict neutrality because the United States had some favorable policies towards the Allies, for example by generally-favourable trade decisions, which were accentuated by the better availability of information about the Allies and the pre-existing state of public opinion. Eventually, benevolent neutrality favoured the Allies even more by allowing them loans and arms. Grey's description would become outdated, as the United States would enter into a state of armed neutrality, with the declaration of the Sussex pledge after US President Woodrow Wilson's First Warning to the Germans.

The same policy also played a role in World War II before Pearl Harbor in that US trade policies and diplomacy strongly favored United Kingdom and France in opposition to Germany.

References 

Foreign relations of the United States
International relations theory
Non-interventionism
World War I